Thomas B. Bryant III (born September 23, 1937) is an American lawyer and politician. He served as a member of the South Carolina House of Representatives.

Life and career 
Bryant was born in Orangeburg, South Carolina, He attended Washington and Lee University.

In 1969, Bryant was elected to the South Carolina House of Representatives, representing Orangeburg County, South Carolina.

References 

1937 births
Living people
People from Orangeburg, South Carolina
Members of the South Carolina House of Representatives
20th-century American politicians
Washington and Lee University alumni
South Carolina lawyers